Iván Aaron Herrera (born June 1, 2000) is a Panamanian professional baseball catcher for the St. Louis Cardinals of Major League Baseball (MLB). He made his MLB debut in 2022.

Career
Herrera signed with the St. Louis Cardinals as an international free agent in July 2016.

Herrera made his professional debut in 2017 with the Rookie League Dominican Summer League Cardinals, batting .335 with one home run and 27 RBIs over 49 games. In 2018, he spent a majority of the year with the Rookie League Gulf Coast Cardinals while also playing in two games with the Springfield Cardinals of the Class AA Texas League at the end of the year. Over 30 games with both teams, Herrera hit .336 with one home run and 25 RBIs. Herrera began the 2019 season with the Peoria Chiefs of the Class A Midwest League before being promoted to the Palm Beach Cardinals of the Class A-Advanced Florida State League in July; over 87 games between the two clubs, he slashed .284/.374/.405 with nine home runs and 47 RBIs. After the season, he was selected to play in the Arizona Fall League with the Glendale Desert Dogs, with whom he was named an All-Star.

Herrera was a non-roster invite to 2020 spring training. He did not play a minor league game in 2020 due to the cancellation of the minor league season caused by the COVID-19 pandemic. After the 2020 season, the Cardinals added Herrera to their 40-man roster. Herrera spent a majority of the 2021 season with Springfield, slashing .231/.346/.408 with 17 home runs and 63 RBIs over 98 games. He played in one game for the Memphis Redbirds of the Triple-A East to end the season.

Herrera began the 2022 season with Memphis. On May 23, 2022, the Cardinals promoted him to the major leagues. He made his MLB debut the next day. Herrera appeared in 11 games for St. Louis, hitting .111/.191/.111 with 6 RBI. He spent the majority of the season with Memphis, hitting .268/.374/.396 with 6 home runs, 34 RBI, and 5 stolen bases.

Herrera was optioned to Triple-A Memphis to begin the 2023 season.

References

External links

2000 births
Living people
Major League Baseball players from Panama
Panamanian expatriate baseball players in the United States
Major League Baseball catchers
St. Louis Cardinals players
Dominican Summer League Cardinals players
Gulf Coast Cardinals players
Peoria Chiefs players
Palm Beach Cardinals players
Springfield Cardinals players
Memphis Redbirds players
Glendale Desert Dogs players
Cañeros de Los Mochis players